Salem Mashour (born 20 November 1940) is an Egyptian rower. He competed in the men's coxed four event at the 1964 Summer Olympics.

References

1940 births
Living people
Egyptian male rowers
Olympic rowers of Egypt
Rowers at the 1964 Summer Olympics
Place of birth missing (living people)